Medinodexia is a genus of tachinid flies in the family Tachinidae.

Species
M. exigua Shima, 1979
M. fulviventris Townsend, 1927
M. japonica Tachi & Huang, 2019
M. morgani (Hardy, 1934)
M. orientalis Shima, 1979

References

Diptera of Asia
Diptera of Australasia
Exoristinae
Tachinidae genera
Taxa named by Charles Henry Tyler Townsend